Mariana Cress (born August 12, 1998) is an American-Marshallese sprinter. She is the current holder of the Marshallese records for the 100 metres and 200 metres. She competed for the women's 100 metres in the 2016 Summer Olympics.

International competitions

Personal Bests
Outdoor

References

External links
 
All-Athletics profile

Living people
1998 births
Track and field athletes from Minneapolis
Marshallese female sprinters
American female sprinters
Olympic track and field athletes of the Marshall Islands
Athletes (track and field) at the 2016 Summer Olympics
Olympic female sprinters
21st-century American women